Rémy Mertz (born 17 July 1995 in Luxembourg City) is a Belgian cyclist, who currently rides for UCI ProTeam . He was named in the startlist for the 2017 Vuelta a España.

Major results

2014
 8th Overall Flèche du Sud
2015
 1st Stage 5 Carpathian Couriers Race
2016
 5th Coppa dei Laghi-Trofeo Almar
 6th Liege–Bastogne–Liege Espoirs
2019
 5th Famenne Ardenne Classic
 10th Le Samyn
2021
 3rd Clássica da Arrábida
 7th Overall Volta a la Comunitat Valenciana
 8th Tour du Doubs
2022
 3rd Per sempre Alfredo
2023
 6th Per sempre Alfredo

Grand Tour general classification results timeline

References

External links

1995 births
Living people
Belgian male cyclists
Sportspeople from Luxembourg City
21st-century Belgian people